Carabus rustemi is a species of black coloured ground beetle in the Carabinae subfamily that is endemic to Kazakhstan.

References

rustemi
Beetles described in 2009
Beetles of Asia
Endemic fauna of Kazakhstan